Mount Denauro is a mountain,  high, standing on the west side of Scott Glacier, 3 nautical miles (6 km) south of Lee Peak, in the Queen Maud Mountains. It was mapped by the United States Geological Survey from surveys and U.S. Navy air photos, 1960–64, and was named by the Advisory Committee on Antarctic Names for Ralph Denauro, an aviation mechanic with U.S. Navy Squadron VX-6 on Operation Deep Freeze 1966.

References

Mountains of the Ross Dependency
Amundsen Coast